Naria cernica is a species of sea snail, a cowry, a marine gastropod mollusk in the family Cypraeidae, the cowries.

Subspecies
 Naria cernica cernica (G. B. Sowerby II, 1870)
 Naria cernica leforti (Senders & P. Martin, 1987)
 Naria cernica viridicolor (C. N. Cate, 1962)

 Naria cernica marielae (Cate, 1960): synonym of Naria cernica cernica (G. B. Sowerby II, 1870)
 Naria cernica ogasawarensis (Schilder, 1944): synonym of Naria cernica cernica (G. B. Sowerby II, 1870)
 Naria cernica tomlini (Schilder, 1930): synonym of Naria cernica cernica (G. B. Sowerby II, 1870)

Description

Distribution
This species occurs in the Indian Ocean off Chagos, Easter Island, the Mascarene Basin and Mauritius.

References

 Senders & Martin, 1987. Description d'une nouvelle sous-espèce de Cypraeidae en provenance de l'Ile de Paques. Apex 2(1): 13-17
 Lorenz, F. (2017). Cowries. A guide to the gastropod family Cypraeidae. Volume 1, Biology and systematics. Harxheim: ConchBooks. 644 pp.

External links
 G. B., II. (1870). Monograph of the genus Cypraea. In G. B. Sowerby II (ed.), Thesaurus conchyliorum, or monographs of genera of shells. Vol. 4 (26-28): 1–58, pls 292–328. London, privately published

Cypraeidae
Gastropods described in 1870